Administratively, Lesotho is divided into ten districts, each headed by a district administrator. Each district has a capital known as a camptown.

The districts are further subdivided into 80 constituencies, which consists of 129 local community councils.

References 

 
Lesotho
Lesotho